There have been 36 players who have scored 500 or more goals in Australian top-level rugby league, i.e. the NRL and its predecessors, the NSWRL, ARL and SL premierships. Players still currently active are listed in bold.

See also

List of National Rugby League players with five tries in a game
List of players who have played 300 NRL games
List of players with 1,000 NRL points
List of players with 20 NRL field goals
List of players with 100 NRL tries
List of players with 100 NRL tries and 500 NRL goals

References

NRL players with 500 NRL goals
Players with 500 NRL goals
 Goals,500